Rakuwa  is a Rural Municipality in Nawalpur District in the Lumbini Zone of southern Nepal. At the time of the 1991 Nepal census it had a population of 2248 people living in 419 individual households.

References

Populated places in Nawalpur District